The Gaurishvara Temple (also spelled Gaurishwara or Gaurisvara) is located in the town of Yelandur, Chamarajanagar district of Karnataka state, India. The temple was constructed by a local chief Singedepa Devabhupala of the Hadinadu chiefdom, a feudatory of the 16th century Vijayanagara Empire.

Architectural features
The temple plan is simple. It has a sanctum (garbhagriha), a closed hall (mantapa), an open hall supported by granite pillars, and an unusual mahadwara (grand entrance) which lacks the usual tower (gopuram) over it. This type of an entrance is called bale mantapa (lit, bangled hall) in a contemporary style. The sanctum contains the linga, the universal symbol of the Hindu god Shiva. The closed hall has images of various Hindu deities; Vishnu, Shanmukha, Parvati, Mahishasuramardini (a form of the goddess Durga), Bhairava (a form of the god Shiva), Durga, Virabhadra (another form of Shiva) and Ganapati. The walls of the entrance are heavily decorated with reliefs depicting scenes from the puranic stories and the epics. An unusual decoration provided to the entrance are the chains of stone rings (bale).

References

Gallery

References 

 

16th-century Hindu temples
Hindu temples in Chamarajanagar district